Dyella soli is a Gram-negative, aerobic, rod-shaped, non-spore-forming and motile bacterium from the genus of Dyella with a polar flagellum which has been isolated from forest soil from the Jeju island on Korea.

References

Xanthomonadales
Bacteria described in 2009